Heliophanus transversus is a species of jumping spiders in the genus Heliophanus that lives in Lesotho. It was first identified in 2014.

References

Salticidae
Fauna of Lesotho
Spiders of Africa
Spiders described in 2014
Taxa named by Wanda Wesołowska